The BMW N57 is a family of aluminium, turbocharged straight-6 common rail diesel engines. The engines utilize variable geometry turbochargers and Bosch piezo-electric injectors. The engine jointly replaced the M57 straight-6 and M67 V8 engines. In 2015 the N57 started to be replaced with the B57 engine, beginning with the G11 730d.

Summary

N57D30
N57D30Ox has 1800 bar fuel pressure, while N57D30Tx has 2000 bar fuel pressure.
N57D30Ox uses a single turbocharger, while N57D30Tx uses twin-turbochargers, and N57S uses three turbochargers of varying size.
Bore x stroke: 
This kit included the larger intercooler of the N57D30T0

Applications:
N57D30U0
2010 - 2011 BMW 5 Series F10/F11 525d
2010 - 2013 BMW 3 Series E90/E91/E92/E93 325d
N57D30O0
2008 - 2013 BMW 3 Series E90/E91/E92/E93 330d/330xd
2010 - 2011 BMW 5 Series F10/F11 530d
2009 -  BMW 5 Series GT F07 530d GT/530d xDrive GT
2008 - 2012 BMW 7 Series F01/F02 730d/730Ld
2010 - 2013 BMW X5 E70 xDrive30d
2010 - 2014 BMW X6 E71 xDrive30d
N57D30O1
2011 - 2016 BMW 5 Series F10/F11 530d
2011 -  BMW X3 F25 xDrive30d
2011 - 2016 BMW X5 F15 xDrive35d
2012 - 2019 BMW 3 Series F30/F31 330d
2014 -  BMW 4 Series F32/F33/F36 430d
2012 - 2015 BMW 7 Series F01/F02 730d/730Ld
N57D30T0
2010 - 2011 BMW 5 Series F10/F11 535d
2009 - 2017 BMW 5 Series GT F07 535d GT/535d xDrive GT
2009 - 2015 BMW 7 Series F01 740d/740d xDrive
2010 - 2013 BMW X5 E70 xDrive40d
2010 - 2014 BMW X6 E71 xDrive40d
N57D30T1
2011 - 2016 BMW 5 Series F10/F11 535d
2011 - 2018 BMW 6 Series F12/F13 640d
2011 -  BMW X3 F25 xDrive35d
2013 - 2019 BMW 3 Series F30/F31 335d
2014 -  BMW 4 Series F32/F33/F36 435d
2014 -  BMW X4 F26 X4 xDrive35d
2014 -  BMW X5 F15 X5 xDrive40d
2015 -  BMW X6 F16 X6 xDrive40d
N57S (Tri-Turbo)
2012 - 2017 BMW 5 Series F10/F11 M550d xDrive
2012 - 2015 BMW 7 Series F01 750d xDrive
2012 - 2015 BMW 7 Series F01 750Ld xDrive
2012 - 2013 BMW X5 E70 M50d
2012 - 2014 BMW X6 M50d
2013 - 2018 BMW X5 F15 M50d
2015 - 2018 BMW X6 F16 M50d

Engine fires in police vehicles

In January 2022, BMW released a statement acknowledging the presence of a technical issue with the N57 engine which may have contributed to instances of police vehicles in the United Kingdom catching fire, including one case in January 2020 which resulted in the death of a British police officer. This issue led to police forces across the United Kingdom withdrawing, retiring or limiting the speed of vehicles powered by the N57 engine, preventing their use in pursuits. In the press release, BMW stated “This issue is associated with the particular way in which the police operate these high-performance vehicles […] there is no need for action on civilian vehicles”.
It was reported that the issue was caused by high-speed driving after long periods of engine idling.

Safety concerns about this engine in 2016, and the 2022 inquest into the death of PC Nicholas Dumphreys on 26 January 2020, had the consequence that in January 2023, BMW stopped supplying cars to UK police altogether and closed down their International and Specialist Sales Division at their dealership in Park Lane, Mayfair. Police forces are instead moving to other brands models, such as the Volvo XC90 and Volkswagen Touareg.

See also
 List of BMW engines

References

External links
 The UnixNerd's BMW N57 engine page  with photos, history and common problems.

N57
Diesel engines by model
Straight-six engines